McPherson is a Scottish surname. It is an Anglicised form of the Gaelic Mac a' Phearsain and Mac a Phearsoin, meaning "son of the parson". Notable people with the surname include:

In sports 
Adrian McPherson, American  football player
Archie McPherson (footballer), Scottish footballer
Bill McPherson (disambiguation), multiple people
Cheryl McPherson (born 1963), Canadian curler
Dallas McPherson, American baseball player
Daniel McPherson, Australian rules footballer
David McPherson (disambiguation), multiple people
Don McPherson, American academic and football player
Donald McPherson (figure skater), Canadian figure skater
Evan McPherson (born 1999), American football player
James McPherson (cricketer), (1842–1891), Australian cricketer
John McPherson (disambiguation), multiple people
Kristy McPherson, Professional  golfer on the LPGA
Lachlan McPherson (born 1900), Scottish footballer
Robert McPherson (disambiguation), multiple people

In politics and law 
 Bruce McPherson, American politician
 Edward McPherson, American politician
 Ewan McPherson, Canadian politician and judge
 Sir John Macpherson, 1st Baronet, Governor-General of Bengal
 Harriet McPherson, American politician, farmer, and educator
 Newton Leroy McPherson, birth name of Newt Gingrich
 Sean McPherson, American politician
 Tom McPherson, American politician

In music 
 Casey McPherson, musician from Austin, Texas
 Dave McPherson (musician), English singer and guitarist for rock band InMe and drummer for metal band Centiment
 Gordon McPherson, Scottish composer
 Graham McPherson, better known as Suggs, British vocalist of the second-wave ska band, Madness
 Greg McPherson, English singer and guitarist for metal band Centiment and bassist for rock band InMe
 JD McPherson, American musician

In the military 
 Andrew McPherson (RAF officer), Scottish World War II pilot
 James B. McPherson, an American general of the Union Army during the American Civil War
 Stewart McPherson (VC), a Scottish recipient of the Victoria Cross

In theatre and literature 
 Anna Talbott McPherson, American biographer and illustrator
 Conor McPherson, Irish playwright and director
 James Alan McPherson, American novelist and short story writer
 James M. McPherson, American Civil War author and historian at Princeton University
 John Macpherson (minister), Scottish minister and antiquarian
 Neil McPherson (artistic director), British theatre director
 Rosamond McPherson "Roz" Young (1912–2005), American columnist, author, educator and historian

In business 
 Lydia Starr McPherson (1827–1903), American newspaper writer, editor, and founder
 William McPherson Allen, president of the Boeing Company from 1945 to 1970

Others 
 Aimee Semple McPherson, American evangelist in the 1920s and 1930s
 Lisa McPherson, scientologist who died while in the care of the Church of Scientology
 Stewart McPherson (geographer), British geographer

See also 

 McPhearson
 Macpherson

Scottish surnames
English-language surnames
Anglicised Scottish Gaelic-language surnames
Patronymic surnames
Occupational surnames